Kharpunath is a rural municipality located in Humla District of Karnali Province of Nepal.

The rural municipality is divided into total 5 wards and the headquarters of the rural municipality is situated at Kharpunath.

Demographics
At the time of the 2011 Nepal census, 99.3% of the population in Kharpunath Rural Municipality spoke Nepali, 0.5% Sign language and 0.2% Tamang as their first language.

In terms of ethnicity/caste, 32.5% were Chhetri, 30.9% Thakuri, 15.1% Byasi/Sauka, 11.3% Kami, 3.5% Hill Brahmin, 3.2% Sarki, 2.8% Damai/Dholi, 0.2% Tamang, 0.2% other Terai and 0.3% others.

In terms of religion, 84.8% were Hindu and 15.2% Buddhist.

References

External links
 Official website

Populated places in Humla District
Rural municipalities in Karnali Province
Rural municipalities of Nepal established in 2017